Khilek is the name of the plant Senna siamea in Thai.

Several places in Thailand are named after this plant:

Khilek, Mae Taeng
Khilek, Mae Rim
Khilek, Nam Khun